Simeon Tochukwu Nwankwo (born 7 May 1992), known simply as Simy, is a Nigerian professional footballer who plays as a forward for  club Benevento, on loan from Salernitana. He has represented the Nigeria national team.

Simy is the only African footballer to have been top scorer in an Italian professional league (2019–20 Serie B). With 66 goals in all competitions, he is Crotone's all-time top scorer. Simy is also the only African footballer, alongside Samuel Eto'o in 2010–11, to have scored 20 goals in one Serie A season, having achieved the feat in 2020–21.

Club career 
In July 2016, Simy signed for Crotone, newly promoted to Serie A.

He scored seven goals during the 2017–18 campaign, tied with Ante Budimir for second-most for the club and only one behind top scorer Marcello Trotta. This included a memorable overhead kick in a 1–1 draw against champions Juventus on 19 April 2018. Crotone, however, would be relegated at season's end.

Although the club struggled to a twelfth place finish in their return to Serie B, Simy was able to find his form and have his best season since moving to Italy, finishing first on his team and sixth overall in goals with fourteen. He bested this in the 2019–20 campaign, topping Serie B with twenty goals and helping his team earn promotion back to Italy's top flight. Simy was prolific again during the 2020–21 season, scoring 20 league goals, but this was not enough to prevent Crotone from being relegated after a single season in the top flight. On 19 August 2021, Simy moved to newly-promoted Serie A club Salernitana on a season-long loan.

Salernitana
On 9 January 2022, Simy rights was acquired fully by Salernitana for a fee of €3.5m. On 31 January 2022, he was loaned out to Serie B club Parma for the remainder of the season with an option to buy.

On 1 September 2022, Simy moved to Benevento on loan with an option to buy.

International career
On 25 May 2018, Simy was called up to the Nigeria national team's camp by coach Gernot Rohr in preparation for the 2018 FIFA World Cup in Russia. Three days later, he made his international debut in a 1–1 draw against the DR Congo. In June he was named in Nigeria's final 23-man squad for the World Cup. He made his first appearance at the tournament against Croatia where he came in as a second-half substitute whilst Nigeria were 2–0 down. He also played as substitute in the 2–1 defeat against Argentina who eliminated Nigeria from the World Cup.

Personal life 
Simy is the eldest of three children. His brother, a physiotherapist, and sister, a nurse, are twins. Simy and his wife are Catholic and have a son. Simy has been the subject of racial abuse on social media during his time in Crotone, including wishes that his son 'would die of pancreatic cancer'. Taking a stand against racism, Crotone's mayor, Vincenzo Voce, gave honorary citizenship of the city to Nwankwo's son on 27 March 2021.

Career statistics

Club

International

References

External links
 
 Simy at Goalsreplay.com

1992 births
Living people
Sportspeople from Onitsha
Association football forwards
Nigerian footballers
Nigeria international footballers
2018 FIFA World Cup players
Primeira Liga players
Liga Portugal 2 players
Serie A players
Serie B players
Portimonense S.C. players
Gil Vicente F.C. players
F.C. Crotone players
U.S. Salernitana 1919 players
Parma Calcio 1913 players
Benevento Calcio players
Nigerian expatriate footballers
Nigerian expatriate sportspeople in Portugal
Expatriate footballers in Portugal
Nigerian expatriate sportspeople in Italy
Expatriate footballers in Italy
Nigerian Roman Catholics